This is a list of Minnesota Wild award winners.

League awards

Team trophies
The Minnesota Wild have not won any of the team trophies the National Hockey League (NHL) awards annually — the Stanley Cup as league champions, the Clarence S. Campbell Bowl as Western Conference playoff champions and the Presidents' Trophy as the team with the most regular season points.

Individual awards

All-Stars

NHL first and second team All-Stars
The NHL first and second team All-Stars are the top players at each position as voted on by the Professional Hockey Writers' Association.

NHL All-Rookie Team
The NHL All-Rookie Team consists of the top rookies at each position as voted on by the Professional Hockey Writers' Association.

All-Star Game selections
The National Hockey League All-Star Game is a mid-season exhibition game held annually between many of the top players of each season. Fourteen All-Star Games have been held since the Wild entered the league in 2000, with at least one player chosen to represent the Wild in each year except 2001 and 2002. The All-Star game has not been held in various years: 1979 and 1987 due to the 1979 Challenge Cup and Rendez-vous '87 series between the NHL and the Soviet national team, respectively, 1995, 2005, and 2013 as a result of labor stoppages, 2006, 2010, and 2014 because of the Winter Olympic Games, and 2021 as a result of the COVID-19 pandemic. Minnesota has hosted one of the games. The 54th took place at Xcel Energy Center.

Career achievements

Hockey Hall of Fame
The Minnesota Wild have not had any players or personnel who have been enshrined in the Hockey Hall of Fame. Jacques Lemaire, the team's head coach from 2000 to 2009, was inducted in the Players category in 1985.

Lester Patrick Trophy
The Lester Patrick Trophy has been presented by the National Hockey League and USA Hockey since 1966 to honor a recipient's contribution to ice hockey in the United States. This list includes all personnel who have ever been employed by the Minnesota Wild in any capacity and have also received the Lester Patrick Trophy.

Retired numbers

The Minnesota Wild have retired two of their jersey numbers. Prior to the Wild's first home opener on October 11, 2000, the team retired number 1 "in honor of the fans who helped bring back the NHL." On March 13, 2022, the Wild retired number 9 in honor of Mikko Koivu. Also out of circulation is the number 99 which was retired league-wide for Wayne Gretzky on February 6, 2000.

See also
List of National Hockey League awards

References

Minnesota Wild
award